Burlington is a community in the Canadian province of Nova Scotia, located in Kings County.

References
 Burlington on Destination Nova Scotia

Communities in Kings County, Nova Scotia
General Service Areas in Nova Scotia